Hemmatabad-e Sistaniha (also Romanized as Hemmatābād-e Sīstānīhā; also known as Hemmatābād) is a village in Kongor Rural District, in the Central District of Kalaleh County, Golestan Province, Iran. At the 2006 census, its population was 220, in 49 families.

References 

Populated places in Kalaleh County